The puffed rice cake is a flat hard food made with puffed rice. Typically, it is eaten as a snack or used as a base for other ingredients.

While it is low in nutrients, it is generally considered to be a low-calorie food, and is often consumed among dieters as a substitute for higher-calorie breads or other food items.

Some rice cakes are flavored. Common flavorings include chicken, sweet chili, cheese, butter, chocolate, caramel, salt and vinegar, or apple cinnamon.

Most rice cakes are round, though square varieties are available.

Wor Bar
Traditionally, Wor Bar (Guoba in Mandarin, translates to "pot's burnt") refers to the slightly browned rice that is stuck to the bottom of clay pots, which, after caramelization, results in the rice being formed into a single piece and giving it a slightly burned flavor. It may be brewed into tea, or served as part of a main meal by pouring savory meat sauces over the heated puffed rice cake.

Gallery

References

Snack foods
Dried foods
Rice cakes